The Saarland State Police is one of the smallest German Landespolizei forces with approx. 2,700 police officers. As in Hesse and Rheinland-Pfalz, the Saarland Police is abolishing the “green star” ranks, meaning their new police officers start working patrols as Kommissars. This reform aims at making the police profession more attractive and improving the chances of promotion.

Organisation
The state police falls under the jurisdiction of the Saarland state interior ministry and has two main police authorities, the Landespolizeidirektion (LPD) which is the state police headquarters, and the State Investigation Bureau (Landeskriminalamt or LKA), which are both located in Saarbrücken.

The Landespolizeidirektion consists of four departments, the Police Support Group (Bereitschaftspolizei), Services, Traffic Police, and Investigations. The Police Support Group consists of the state's rapid reaction company, police dog section, the police band and the river police station in Beckingen that patrols the Saar and Moselle in Saarland. Police stations are located in Merzig-Wadern, St. Wendel, Neunkirchen, Saarpfalz-Kreis, Saarlouis, Saarbrücken (city), and Saarbrücken (region).

Approximately 400 investigators and forensic scientists work for the State Investigation Bureau.

Vehicles
In the Saarland, which is adjacent to and historically closely tied to France, vehicles made by French companies, as well as European Ford, are often used as police cars. The Saarland Police registers its new vehicles with the state government license plate combination SAL 4 - XXXX. SAL stands for Saarland Landesregierung (Saarland state government), 4 denotes police, and XXXX is a combination of four numbers.

Uniforms
Initially, the Saarland state government did not intend to convert to blue police uniforms as had happened in other states, and so Saarland would have been one of only two German states to keep the green/khaki uniform, the other one being Bavaria. However, due to the small number of providers for green uniforms, the Saarland police changed their uniforms from green to blue and assumed the model of the Hessian police in 2014.

References

External links
Saarland Police homepage (in German)

Organisations based in Saarland
State law enforcement agencies of Germany